Wang Wanyu (born 14 February 1997) is a Chinese rugby sevens player. She competed in the women's tournament at the 2020 Summer Olympics.

References

External links
 

1997 births
Living people
Female rugby sevens players
Olympic rugby sevens players of China
Rugby sevens players at the 2020 Summer Olympics
Sportspeople from Xuzhou
Rugby union players at the 2018 Asian Games
Asian Games silver medalists for China
Asian Games medalists in rugby union
Medalists at the 2018 Asian Games
China international women's rugby sevens players